The  is a commuter electric multiple unit (EMU) train type operated by the private railway operator Kintetsu Railway since 1981 on many of its commuter lines in the Kansai area of Japan.

Design 
First introduced in 1984, the design is based on the earlier Kintetsu 3000 series commuter train, also manufactured by Kinki Sharyo.

All trains are equipped with longitudinal seating and automatic announcements in both Japanese and English. All trainsets run on standard gauge , except for the 6600 series which run on  gauge on the Minami Osaka Line.

Variants 

 1200 series (2nd Generation): 4-car sets primarily used on the Nagoya Line
 1201 series:  2-car sets primarily used on the Nagoya Line equipped for wanman driver-only operation
 1400 series: 4-car sets primarily used on the Nagoya Line
 2050 series: 3-car sets primarily used on the Nagoya Line
 6600 series: 2-car narrow-gauge sets primarily used on the Minami Osaka Line network

1200 series (2nd generation) 

The 1200 series is the final variant in the 1400 series family. Originally, 11 four-car sets were built in 1982, but in 1983, all but one of the sets were converted into the 1201 series.

Formations 
The sole remaining set is formed as follows.

Interior 
Like all variants, seating consists of longitudinal seating throughout.

1201 series 

The 1201 series are former 1200 series sets that were converted to ten 2-car sets and re-fitted for wanman (driver-only) operation. Only one set, the one listed above remained a 1200 series.

Formations 
Sets are formed as follows.

Interior 
As it was before the conversion, and like the other models, seating consists of longitudinal seating throughout.

1400 series 

The 1400 series is the original variant, having first appeared in February 1981. Four 4-car sets were built.

Formations 
The four-car sets are formed as follows.

Interior 
As with the other variants, seating consists of longitudinal seating throughout.

2050 series 

Two three-car sets were delivered in 1983 designated as the 2050 series.

Formations 
The sites are formed as follows.

Interior 
Seating consists of longitudinal seating throughout, like all of the other variants. Some cars have onboard toilets.

Refurbishment 
In 2002, the sets were refurbished and modeled similar to the 1200 series. A second renovation occurred around 2020.

6600 series 

Four two-car sets were delivered in 1983 designated as the 6600 series.

Operations 
The sets are operated on the  Minami Osaka Line network. However, they are not allowed on the Domyoji Line as they are not equipped for wanman driver-only operation.

Formation 
The sets are formed as follows. Both cars are motorized.

Interior 
Seating consists of longitudinal seating throughout, like the standard gauge variants.

References 

Electric multiple units of Japan
1400 series
1500 V DC multiple units of Japan
Kinki Sharyo multiple units